Šmartno v Rožni Dolini is a settlement in the City Municipality of Celje in eastern Slovenia. It lies on the northern outskirts of Celje. The area is part of the traditional region of Styria. It is now included with the rest of the municipality in the Savinja Statistical Region.

The local parish church, which the settlement is named after, is dedicated to Saint Martin and belongs to the Roman Catholic Diocese of Celje. It was first mentioned in written documents dating to 1335.

Nearby Lake Šmartno is named after the settlement.

References

External links
Šmartno v Rožni Dolini on Geopedia

Populated places in the City Municipality of Celje